Richard Alan Lewis,  (born 1954) is a former British Davis Cup tennis professional from Middlesex.

He was the chief executive of The AELTC (Championships) Limited, organiser and host of The Championships, Wimbledon. Lewis took up the post in 2012, having been   executive chairman of the Rugby Football League since 2002. On 1 April 2009 he replaced Michael Farrar as chairman of Sport England.

In 2020, after 8 years as chief executive, Lewis stepped down and he was succeeded by Sally Bolton. She became the first woman chief executive to hold that post.

Tennis career
In 1978, Lewis helped Great Britain reach the Davis Cup final and he also played in the 1981 semi-finals. He also achieved a highest ranking of 68th in the world.

Administration

Lawn Tennis Association
After finishing his playing career, Lewis moved into sports administration joining the U.K. Lawn Tennis Association (LTA) in 1987, rising to become its director of tennis, but agreeing to leave his position in the wake of a 2000 loss to Ecuador that led to reduction of British tennis's status from "World" to "Euro-African Zone".

Rugby Football League
Within a year of joining the RFL, Lewis oversaw reunification with the British Amateur Rugby League Association (BARLA) after nearly 30 years of division.

Lewis, it was claimed by then Widnes Vikings chairman Tony Chambers, showed his strong expansionist credentials in 2005 when he allegedly threatened to resign if Super League clubs did not back a plan to save London Broncos, although he denies this.

Under Lewis, plans for a Super League licensing system were introduced.

Through his position at the RFL, Lewis has become Chair of the Rugby League European Federation and Deputy Chair of the Rugby League International Federation.

Following Nigel Wood's appointment as RFL Chief Executive in October 2007, Lewis's role increasingly focuses on developing rugby league in the UK and internationally.

In 2009, when Lewis took on the role of Chair of Sport England, his RFL title changed from Executive Chairman to Chairman.

Lewis was appointed Commander of the Order of the British Empire (CBE) in the 2013 Birthday Honours for services to sports administration.

All England Lawn Tennis and Croquet Club, Wimbledon
In April 2012, Lewis was appointed Chief Executive Officer at Wimbledon following a successful career at the RFL and Chair of Sport England. He replaced Ian Ritchie, who in turn moved on to become chief executive of the Rugby Football Union. During his tenure, Lewis has led the AELTC through the announcement of the Wimbledon Master Plan, the launch of Wimbledon's first consumer-facing brand campaign, "In Pursuit of Greatness", and presided over significant growth of The Championships to become one of the world's biggest annual sporting events.

References

1954 births
Rugby Football League chairmen
Tennis in the United Kingdom
British rugby league administrators
English male tennis players
Living people
Rugby league people in England
Commanders of the Order of the British Empire
British male tennis players
Tennis people from Greater London